First Baptist Academy of Dallas (commonly FBA) is a private, Biblically integrated, college preparatory Christian school located in Dallas, Texas.
First Baptist Academy, previously in Downtown, is now located at a new campus in east Dallas, at the current Saints Athletic Complex. FBA has been educating students at the downtown location for 44 years.

History

Founding 
The school was founded on September 5, 1972, as a passion project of the late W. A. Criswell, then Pastor of First Baptist Church (Dallas) to which the school has a loose affiliation.

School Leadership 
Brian Littlefield served as the head of the school until 2014 when he became the head of Central Texas Christian School. At that time Jason Lovvorn, an alumnus who began working at First Baptist in 2008, became the head of the school.

Neighborhoods served 

First Baptist Academy students come from 76 zip codes in the DFW metroplex. With the new campus in east Dallas, FBA offers transportation for students at a location in Duncanville and downtown Dallas to the new campus on Samuell Blvd.

Mission and Philosophy

Mission Statement 
"First Baptist Academy exists to glorify God through the development and discipleship of the next generation of Christian scholars."

Philosophy 
The school tends to favor the Christian fundamentalism movement believing the quote "We believe that all Scripture is divinely inspired and serves as the final authority in all matters of belief and behavior (2 Timothy 3:16-17; 2 Peter 1:20-21). Therefore, we value Bible-centered teaching as the foundation for all we do."

School 
BFA's student body is organized in three schools (Elementary, Middle, and High School) and is 36% diverse.

FBA offers AP courses in the following subjects: English, Math, Science, History, Government and Politics, and Macroeconomics. FBA also provides a fine arts curriculum including choir, band, and art.

FBA is accredited by the Southern Association of Colleges and Schools, the Accrediting Commission of the Texas Association of Baptist Schools, and AdvancEd.

Athletics
The  Saints Athletic Complex is located at 7894 Samuel Blvd, just east of downtown Dallas off I-30 and the Loop 12/Buckner exit.

FBA competes in TAPPS 2A and fields teams in the following sports.

Fall Sports
 Cheerleading
 Football
 Volleyball
 Dance Team

Winter Sports
 Basketball
 Cheerleading
 Swimming
 Wrestling

Spring Sports
 Baseball
 Golf
 Softball
 Tennis
 Powerlifting, THSPA
 Track & Field

The Saints varsity football team claimed its first TAPPS Division III Championship in 2013.

Service
FBA students participate in OnMission, an initiative designed to move students beyond simple awareness of God's story and into actively contributing to the story. Through participation in local, state, and world mission activities, FBA OnMission is designed to help students develop their God-given desire to live in the story."

References

External links 

First Baptist Academy of Dallas website
First Baptist Academy of Dallas curriculum guide

Baptist schools in the United States
Christian schools in Texas
Educational institutions established in 1972
Private K-12 schools in Dallas